Qinghua Rainbow Bridge was a large stone beam bridge in the town of Qinghua, Wuyuan County, Jiangxi, China. The bridge went across the Le'an River.

Etymology
The name of "Rainbow" derives from Tang dynasty (618–907) Chinese poet Li Bai's poem Climbing Xuancheng Xie Tiao North Tower in Autumn.

History
According to The Records of Wuyuan Scenery, Qinghua Rainbow Bridge was built in the Song dynasty (960–1279), but according to Genealogy of Hu Family in Qinghua and Wuyuan County Annals, it was built in Qianlong period (1736–1796) of the Qing dynasty (1644–1911).

On April 25, 2006, it was listed among the sixth group of "Major National Historical and Cultural Sites in Jiangxi" by the State Council of China.

On the afternoon of July 8, 2020, Qinghua Rainbow Bridge was devastated by flood.

Gallery

References

Stone bridges in China
Beam bridges in China
Bridges in Jiangxi
Song dynasty architecture
Qing dynasty architecture